Experiment Below is the second studio album by the instrumental experimental rock group Hovercraft. It was released on September 22, 1998, through Blast First/Mute Records.

Overview
In 1998, drummer Ric Peterson joined Hovercraft as "Dash 11". His much harder-hitting, more visceral style was the apparent catalyst in the band's shift from ethereal 15-minute songs to more concise, angular arrangements. The album's track "Epoxy" was premiered on Pearl Jam's Monkeywrench Radio broadcast, on January 31, 1998. One year in the making, Experiment Below was Hovercraft's final album. Jason Kaufman of Allmusic said, "This is challenging music that certainly has its rewards for those patient enough to hang around."

Track listing

Personnel
Hovercraft
Campbell 2000 – guitar
Dash 11 – drums
Sadie 7 – bass guitar

Production
S. Hess – orange sphere photo
Hovercraft – production
Aaron Warner – assistant engineering

References

1998 albums
Hovercraft (band) albums
Blast First albums
Mute Records albums